Yorkend Lake is a lake in Haliburton County, Ontario, Canada in the southern extension of Algonquin Park and is the source of the York River.

See also
List of lakes in Ontario

Sources
 Atlas of Canada Topographic Map Sheet Number 031E08 retrieved 2007-11-04

Lakes of Haliburton County